Snack cakes are a type of baked dessert confectionery made with cake, sugar, and icing.

Markets

Canada
The main manufacturer in Canada is Vachon Inc. which makes and distributes such products as May West, Jos. Louis, Passion Flakie, and Ah Caramel!.

Mexico
Grupo Bimbo is a manufacturer of snack cakes in Mexico, and is the parent company of Marinela, which sells the Gansito brand of snack cakes.

United States

Snack cakes can be found in many American supermarkets and convenience stores, sold either individually or by the box. Examples include Drake's Devil Dogs, Twinkies and zebra cakes. Well-known American manufacturers of snack cakes include Hostess, Little Debbie, Dolly Madison, Tastykake and Drake's. In 2004, the snack-cake industry in the US experienced major consolidation, which resulted in fewer products being offered to consumers. For example, Dolly Madison zingers, Hostess brand Twinkies, and Drake's coffee cakes were all solely produced by the now-defunct Interstate Bakeries Corporation.

United Kingdom
Jaffa cakes are a popular type of biscuit-like snack cake in Ireland and the United Kingdom.

See also

 Gansito
 List of desserts

References

Snack foods
Cakes